Sangha Department may refer to:
Sangha Department (Burkina Faso)
Sangha Department (Republic of the Congo)

Department name disambiguation pages